Dwarka Divecha (Dwarkadas Divecha, March 19, 1918 – January 5, 1978) was an Indian cinematographer and actor.

Early life
Divecha was born in Bombay, India.

Career
Divecha worked as a cameraman and cinematographer on about 30 movies.  In 1955 he won a Filmfare Best Photographer in Black and White award for his work on the film Yasmin.

In 1960 he acted in the film Singapore.

His best known film is Sholay, in which he was also involved in creating the sets and special effects.  The film has been since re-released in 3D.  The film was a box office hit, and critics agreed that the quality of the photography contributed to its success.

Divecha died on January 5, 1978.

Major camerawork and cinematography
1943 Sanjog
1944 Ratan
1948 Nai Reet
1949 Dillagi (as Dwarkadas Divecha) 
1949 Paras
1949 Jeet (as Dwarkadas Divecha, photography) 
1950 Dastan
1953 Jeewan Jyoti (Director of photography) 
1953 Dil-E-Nadaan
1955 Baap Re Baap
1955 Yasmin
1958 Do Phool (Photography) 
1958 Solva Saal (Director of photography) 
1959 Chhoti Bahen
1961 Sasural
1962 China Town
1962 Professor
1963 Hamrahi (Photography) 
1964 Beti Bete (as Dwaraka Divecha) 
1966 Daadi Maa
1966 Dil Diya Dard Liya (director of photography)
1966 Amrapali
1968 Jhuk Gaya Aasman
1969 Jeene Ki Raah
1969 Prince (Photography)
1970 Khilona (Director of photography - as Dwaraka Divecha) 
1971 Lal Patthar (Photography) 
1974 Manoranjan (Director of photography) 
1975 Sholay (Director of photography)
1976 Udhar Ka Sindur (Director of photography) 
1978 Trishna (Director of photography - as late Dwarka Divecha)

References

1918 births
1978 deaths
Indian cinematographers
Indian film actors